Baby Come Naa is a 2018 Hindi web comedy series created by Paritosh Painter for Ekta Kapoor's video on demand platform ALTBalaji. The series stars Shreyas Talpade as the protagonist.  The series revolves around the protagonist who is connected with two women and his difficulties in managing both relationships, with the women kept unaware of each other.

The series is available for streaming on the ALT Balaji App and its associated websites since its release date.

Plot
The comedy series revolves around the protagonist Aditya Tendulkar (Shreyas Talpade) who is happy two-timing with two women, Sophie (Manasi Scott) and Sarah (Shefali Zariwala),  both claiming to be his wife. The series explores how Aditya ends up in difficult situations due to his relationships and how his friend Yoyo (Kiku Sharda) helps him to come out of the situation. Baby Come Naa was adapted from Paritosh painters English and Hindi play Double Trouble.

Cast
 Shreyas Talpade as Aditya Tendulkar
 Chunky Pandey as Baburao Lele
 Kiku Sharda as Yoyo Bappi Singh
 Shefali Zariwala as Sarah
 Manasi Scott as Sophie
 Rajendra Chawla as Dara Singh
 Neetha Shetty as Mona

References

External links
 Watch Baby Come Naa on ALT Balaji website
 

2018 web series debuts
Hindi-language web series
ALTBalaji original programming
Indian comedy web series